Lukas Guruh Prayitno (born 31 January 1998), is an Indonesian professional footballer who plays as a left-back for Liga 2 club Kalteng Putra.

Club career

Persela Lamongan
He was signed for Persela Lamongan to play in Liga 1 in the 2019 season. Lukas made his first-team debut on 16 December 2019 in a match against TIRA-Persikabo.

Career statistics

Club

Notes

References

External links
 Lukas Guruh Prayitno at Soccerway
 Lukas Guruh Prayitno at Liga Indonesia

1998 births
Living people
Indonesian footballers
Association football defenders
Persela Lamongan players
People from Depok
Sportspeople from West Java